The 2020 elections for members of the Virginia Beach City Council were held on November 3, 2020. Five seats on the council, including the Mayor of Virginia Beach in the 2020 Virginia Beach mayoral election, were up for election in this cycle. While officially nonpartisan, most of the candidates were affiliated with and endorsed by various political parties.

Background
On January 9, 2020, hotel worker C. Conrad Schesventer II announced his campaign for the Virginia Beach City Council to represent the Rose Hall district.

On May 1, 2020, sales representative Mike Anderson declared his candidacy for the Kempsville seat on the City Council. On June 3, 2020, City Council member Michael Berlucchi announced that he would be running for re-election to keep his seat in the Rose Hall district. A day later, retired businessman Garry Hubbard announced his candidacy for the Rose Hall district seat as well. On June 10, 2020, healthcare network support consultant Brandon Hutchins announced that he would be running for the At-Large seat on the council. Nine days later, former delegate from Virginia's 85th house district Cheryl Turpin announced that she would also be challenging council member Berlucchi for his seat in the Rose Hall district.

On July 4, 2020, City Council member Sabrina Wooten announced her re-election campaign for her seat on the council representing the Centerville district. Two days later, financial advisor Bill Dale declared his candidacy for the Kempsville seat on the council. On July 9, 2020, Turpin announced that she was withdrawing from the race due to personal reasons specifically concerning her elderly mother. In a statement, she elaborated on her decision saying, "At this time I must intensify my advocacy on behalf of my mother, who is 87 years old and suffering from cognitive changes, as challenges attached to the current COVID-19 crisis increase." A day later, City Council member Jessica Abbott announced that she would be running for her incumbent seat representing the Kempsville district. Two days after that, funeral director Eric Wray II declared that he would be challenging Wooten for her seat on the council serving the Centerville district.

On July 22, 2020, Lucia Owen, a candidate for an at-large seat on the Virginia Beach City Council, announced that she was withdrawing from the race due to family priorities. She said that she had recently been involved in a car accident and she was currently pregnant and concerned about going out campaigning during the ongoing COVID-19 pandemic. That same day, longtime City Council member Rosemary Wilson announced that she would be running for a sixth term representing the at-large seat.

On August 4, 2020, businesswoman Nadine Marie Paniccia announced that she too would be seeking to challenge council member Wilson for the at-large seat on the council. On September 14, 2020, Anderson announced that he was withdrawing from the Kempsville election.

On November 4, 2020, results confirmed that all five incumbents on the council, including Wilson, Wooten, Abbott, Berlucchi, and Dyer, had won re-election.

Candidates

At-Large

Withdrew before the election

Centerville district

Kempsville district

Withdrew before the election

Rose Hall district

Withdrew before the election

Endorsements

At Large

Centerville district

Kempsville district

Rose Hall district

Results

Notes

References

2020 Virginia elections